Maik Landsmann  (born 25 October 1967) is a retired track cyclist from East Germany, who represented his native country at the 1988 Summer Olympics in Seoul, South Korea. There he won the gold medal in the men's team time trial (100 km), alongside Uwe Ampler, Jan Schur and Mario Kummer. A year later he won the world title in the same event.

Major results
1988
1st  Team time trial, Summer Olympics (with Uwe Ampler, Mario Kummer and Jan Schur)

References

External links

1967 births
Living people
Sportspeople from Erfurt
People from Bezirk Erfurt
East German male cyclists
East German track cyclists
Olympic cyclists of East Germany
Cyclists at the 1988 Summer Olympics
Olympic gold medalists for East Germany
Olympic medalists in cycling
Medalists at the 1988 Summer Olympics
Cyclists from Thuringia